Robert Andersson (born 22 August 1971) is a retired Swedish professional football forward. Andersson played for Halmstad, IFK Göteborg and Iraklis.

Honours

Halmstad
Allsvenskan (1): 2000

External links

1971 births
Living people
Swedish footballers
Halmstads BK players
IFK Göteborg players
Iraklis Thessaloniki F.C. players
Association football forwards
Swedish expatriate footballers
Expatriate footballers in Greece
Swedish expatriate sportspeople in Greece
Sweden international footballers